Tuckahoe Common School District (TCSD) is a school district headquartered in Southampton, New York. It operates a single school: Tuckahoe School, which serves grades PreK-6.  the superintendent is Leonard Skuggevik.

References

External links
 

School districts in New York (state)
Education in Suffolk County, New York